John Mercer Langston (December 14, 1829 – November 15, 1897) was an American abolitionist, attorney, educator, activist, diplomat, and politician. He was the founding dean of the law school at Howard University and helped create the department. He was the first president of what is now Virginia State University, a historically black college. He was elected a U.S. Representative from Virginia and wrote From the Virginia Plantation to the National Capitol; Or, the First and Only Negro Representative in Congress From the Old Dominion.

Born free in Virginia to a freedwoman of mixed ethnicity and a white English immigrant planter, in 1888 Langston was elected to the U.S. Congress. He was the first Representative of color from Virginia. Joseph Hayne Rainey, the black Republican congressman from South Carolina, had been elected in 1870 during the Reconstruction era.

In the Jim Crow era of the later 19th century, Langston was one of five African Americans elected to Congress from the South before the former Confederate states passed constitutions and electoral rules from 1890 to 1908 that essentially disenfranchised blacks, excluding them from politics. After that, no African Americans would be elected from the South until 1973, after the federal Voting Rights Act of 1965 was passed authorizing the enforcement of their constitutional franchise rights.

Langston's early career was based in Ohio where, with his older brother Charles Henry Langston, he began his lifelong work for African-American freedom, education, equal rights and suffrage. In 1855 he was one of the first African Americans in the United States elected to public office when elected as a town clerk in Ohio. The brothers were the grandfather and great-uncle, respectively, of the renowned poet Langston Hughes.

Early life and education
John Mercer Langston was born free in 1829 in Louisa County, Virginia, the youngest of a daughter and three sons of Lucy Jane Langston, a freedwoman of mixed African-American and Native American descent. She may have had ancestry from the regional Pamunkey tribe. Their father was Ralph Quarles, a white planter from England and her former master. Quarles had freed Lucy and their daughter Maria in 1806, in the course of what was a relationship of more than 25 years. After that, their three sons were born free, as their mother was free. John's older brothers were Gideon and Charles Henry.

Lucy had three children with another partner before she moved into the Great House and deepened her relationship with Quarles. Their three sons were born after this. Of the older half-siblings, William Langston was most involved with Quarles's sons. After their father's death, he relocated with them and a guardian to Chillicothe, Ohio (see below).
  
Before his death, Ralph Quarles arranged for his Quaker friend William Gooch to be made guardian of his children. As requested by Quarles, after the parents both died in 1833 when John Langston was four, Gooch moved with the boys and their half-brother William Langston to Chillicothe, Ohio, in a free state. Quarles had reserved funds for the boys' education. In 1835 the older brothers Gideon and Charles started at the Oberlin Preparatory School, where they were the first African-American students to be admitted. Gideon looked much like his father; at the age of 21 Gideon took Quarles as his surname and thereafter was known as Gideon Quarles. During this time, young John Mercer Langston lived in Cincinnati, part of that time with John Woodson and his wife. He also attended the private Gilmore High School.

The youngest Langston followed his brothers, enrolling in the Oberlin preparatory program. John Langston earned a bachelor's degree in 1849 and a master's degree in theology in 1852 from Oberlin College. He is the first known Black to apply to an American law school. Denied admission to law schools in New York and Ohio because of his race, Langston studied law (or "read the law", as was the common practice then) as an apprentice under abolitionist attorney and Republican US congressman Philemon Bliss, in nearby Elyria; he was admitted to the Ohio bar—the first Black— in 1854. In Ohio, Langston was closely associated with abolitionist lawyer Sherlock James Andrews.

Marriage and family
In 1854 Langston married Caroline Matilda Wall, at the time a senior at Oberlin College. From North Carolina, she was the daughter of an enslaved mother and Colonel Stephen Wall, a wealthy white planter. Wall freed his mixed-race daughters Sara and Caroline, and sent them to Ohio to be raised in an affluent Quaker household and educated. An intellectual partner of Langston, Caroline had five children with him, one of whom died in childhood.

When Langston was serving as dean of Howard University's Law School, which he developed (see below), he and his family met James Carroll Napier, a student there. Napier married their daughter Nettie, who had graduated from Oberlin College. She later became an important activist. After law school, Napier had returned to Nashville, Tennessee, to set up his law practice before marriage. There he also became a successful businessman and politician. He was appointed in 1911 as Register of the Treasury in President William Howard Taft's administration and was one of four members of his "Black Cabinet".

Career

Together with his older brothers Gideon and Charles, John Langston became active in the abolitionist movement. He helped refugee slaves to escape to the North along the Ohio part of the Underground Railroad. In 1858 he and Charles partnered in leading the Ohio Anti-Slavery Society, with John acting as president and traveling to organize local units, and Charles managing as executive secretary in Cleveland. John played a key role in the influential Oberlin–Wellington Rescue of 1858.

In 1863, when the federal government approved founding of the United States Colored Troops, John Langston was appointed to recruit African Americans to fight for the Union Army. He enlisted hundreds of men for duty in the Massachusetts Fifty-fourth and Fifty-fifth regiments, in addition to 800 for Ohio's first black regiment. Even before the end of the war, Langston worked for issues of black suffrage and opportunity. He believed that black men's service in the war had earned their right to vote, and that the franchise was fundamental to their creating an equal place in society.

After the war, Langston was appointed inspector general for the Freedmen's Bureau, a Federal organization that assisted freed slaves and tried to oversee labor contracts in the former Confederate states during the Reconstruction era. The Bureau also ran a bank and helped establish schools for freedmen and their children.

In 1864 Langston chaired the committee whose agenda was ratified by the black National Convention: they called for abolition of slavery, support of racial unity and self-help, and equality before the law. To accomplish this program, the convention founded the National Equal Rights League and elected Langston president. He served until 1868. Like the later National Association for the Advancement of Colored People (NAACP) founded in the early 20th century, the League was based in state and local organizations. Langston traveled widely to build support. "By war's end, nine state auxiliaries had been established; some twenty months later, Langston could boast of state leagues nearly everywhere."

In 1868 Langston moved to Washington, D.C., to establish and serve as the founding dean of Howard University's law school; this was the first black law school in the country. Appointed acting president of the school in 1872, and vice president of the school, Langston worked to establish strong academic standards. He also engendered the kind of open environment he had known at Oberlin College. Langston was passed over for the permanent position of president of Howard University School of Law; the selection committee refused to disclose the reason.

During 1870, Langston assisted Republican Senator Charles Sumner from Massachusetts with drafting the civil rights bill that was enacted as the Civil Rights Act of 1875. The 43rd Congress of the United States passed the bill in February 1875 and it was signed into law by President Ulysses S. Grant on March 1, 1875.

President Ulysses S. Grant appointed Langston as a member of the Board of Health of the District of Columbia.

In 1877 President Rutherford Hayes appointed Langston as U.S. Minister to Haiti; he also served as chargé d'affaires to the Dominican Republic.

After his diplomatic service, in 1885 Langston returned to the US and Virginia. He was appointed by the state legislature as the first president of Virginia Normal and Collegiate Institute, established as a historically black college (HBCU) and land grant college at Petersburg. (It is now Virginia State University.) There he also began to build a political base.

In 1888, Langston was urged to run for a seat in the U.S. House of Representatives by fellow Republicans, both black and white. Leaders of the biracial Readjuster Party, which had held political power in Virginia from 1879 to 1883, did not support his candidacy.

Langston ran as a Republican and lost to his Democratic opponent. He, with Jesse Lawson as his legal counsel, contested the results of the election because of voter intimidation and fraud. After 18 months, the Congressional elections committee declared Langston the winner, and he took his seat in the U.S. Congress. He served for the remaining six months of the term, but lost his bid for reelection as conservative white Democrats had regained political control of Virginia.

Langston was the first black person elected to Congress from Virginia, and he was the last for another century. In a period of increasing disenfranchisement of blacks in the South, he was one of five African Americans elected to Congress during the Jim Crow era of the last decade of the nineteenth century. Two men were elected from South Carolina and two from North Carolina. After them, no African Americans would be elected to Congress from the South until 1972, after passage of the Voting Rights Act to enforce the exercise of constitutional franchise rights for all citizens.

In 1890 Langston was named as a member of the board of trustees of St. Paul Normal and Industrial School, a historically black college, when it was incorporated by the Virginia General Assembly. In this period, he also wrote his autobiography, which he published in 1894.

From 1891 until his death in 1897, he practiced law in Washington, D.C. He died at his home, Hillside Cottage at 2225 Fourth Street NW in Washington, DC, on the morning of November 15. He was first buried at Harmony Cemetery in Maryland. Although there was discussion of reinterring him in Nashville, he was reinterred at Woodlawn Cemetery in Washington, DC.

Langston was the great-uncle of the poet James Mercer Langston Hughes (better known as Langston Hughes).

Legacy and honors
The John Mercer Langston House in Oberlin, Ohio, has been designated as a National Historic Landmark.

The town of Langston, Oklahoma, founded in 1890 as an all-black town, was named for him. The historically black college in the town, founded in 1897 as the Oklahoma Colored Agricultural and Normal University, was renamed  Langston University in honor of John Mercer Langston in 1941.

Langston High School in Johnson City, Tennessee, established in 1893, was named for Langston. John M. Langston High School in Danville, Virginia was also named for John Mercer Langston, as was Langston High School in Hot Springs, Arkansas. Future leaders who attended this school included professional football player Ike Thomas, civil rights activist Mamie Phipps Clark, and physician Edith Mae Irby Jones.

John Mercer Langston Elementary School at 33 P Street NW in Washington, D.C. was named in his honor. It opened in 1902 as a school for black students and operated until 1993. In 1997 the building served as a homeless shelter, but it has mostly been vacant since the school closed.

On July 17, 2021, the Arlington County, Virginia County Board voted to rename its portion of U.S. Route 29, previously named Lee Highway, after John M. Langston. An elementary and community center on U.S. Route 29 already bear his name.

Langston Golf Course in Washington, DC is named in his honor.

Works
Selected works:

See also
African-American officeholders in the United States, 1789–1866
Civil rights movement (1865–1896)
List of African-American firsts
List of African-American United States representatives

Notes

References
Cheek, William Francis, and Aimee Lee Cheek, John Mercer Langston and the Fight for Black Freedom, 1829-65. Urbana and Chicago: University of Illinois Press, 1989.
Wagner, Jean, Black Poets of the United States: From Paul Laurence Dunbar to Langston Hughes, University of Illinois Press, 1973, .
William Cheek, "A Negro Runs for Congress: John Mercer Langston and the Virginia Campaign of 1888", The Journal of Negro History, 52 (January 1967).
W. Cheek, "John Mercer Langston: Black Protest Leader and Abolitionist", Civil War History 16 (March 1970).

Attribution:

External links

 "John Mercer Langston", Congressional Biography
 Langston Biography, Black Americans in Congress, 1870-2007
 "John Mercer Langston", Oberlin College biography
 John Mercer Langston Speeches, Oberlin College speech collection
 Kevin Mérida, "The 'Obama Before Obama'", Washington Post, June 7, 2008
 "Biography of John Mercer Langston" including youthful photograph, AfricanAmericans.com
 Langston High School Continuation Program in Arlington, Virginia

|-

|-

|-

|-

1829 births
1897 deaths
19th-century American politicians
Activists from Ohio
African-American abolitionists
African-American diplomats
African-American lawyers
African-American members of the United States House of Representatives
African-American people in Ohio politics
African-American people in Virginia politics
African-American politicians during the Reconstruction Era
Ambassadors of the United States to Haiti
Ambassadors of the United States to the Dominican Republic
American people of English descent
American people of Native American descent
Burials at Woodlawn Cemetery (Washington, D.C.)
Free Negroes
Howard University faculty
Langston family
Multiracial affairs in the United States
Native American members of the United States Congress
Oberlin College alumni
Ohio lawyers
People from Louisa County, Virginia
People from Oberlin, Ohio
Republican Party members of the United States House of Representatives from Virginia
Underground Railroad people
Virginia State University people
Washington, D.C., Republicans
19th-century American diplomats
19th-century American lawyers